West Maka Ska, formerly known as West Calhoun, is a neighborhood in the U.S. city of Minneapolis. The neighborhood was general rural with a couple grain silos along the railroad track heading into Downtown Minneapolis until about the 1910s. Although the railroad still runs through the neighborhood, the neighborhood is now mainly homes, apartment buildings, and strip malls. 

It is the southwestern-most neighborhood of the Calhoun Isles community in the western part of the city. The neighborhood is bordered on the east by East Bde Maka Ska, the north by Cedar-Isles-Dean, the south by Linden Hills and the west by the city of St. Louis Park. Its boundaries are Lake Street to the north, Bde Maka Ska to the east, 36th Street to the south, and France Avenue to the west.

History 
In 2020, the neighborhood voted to change their name to West Maka Ska after the name change of Bde Maka Ska.

References

External links
Minneapolis Ward 13 Neighborhoods
West Maka Ska Neighborhood Council

Neighborhoods in Minneapolis